Sree Vidyanikethan Institute of Management was established in 2007 to select the best intellectual talent from across the country. Located in Tirupati, Andhra Pradesh, India, it was founded with the vision of training students to be the best in their chosen fields of management. SVIM offers two levels of post graduate programs including Master of Business Administration) and Master of Computer Applications. All management programs at Sree Vidyanikethan Institute of Management are approved by the All India Council for Technical Education. The admission process is done by the Integrated Common Entrance Test.

References

External links

Official website

Colleges in Andhra Pradesh
Universities and colleges in Tirupati
2007 establishments in Andhra Pradesh
Educational institutions established in 2007